DeSimone Consulting Engineers is a structural engineering firm founded by Vincent J. DeSimone in 1969 in New York City. The firm provides structural engineering services to architects, owners and developers, and performs structural analysis and design for all types of buildings at all project phases. DeSimone also launched a Property Loss Consulting division in 2016. The company has offices in New York City, Miami, San Francisco, New Haven, Las Vegas, Houston, Abu Dhabi, Boston, Chicago, and Medellin. , DeSimone has designed over 10,000 projects in 40 states and 45 countries.

Engineering

Exoskeleton buildings

DeSimone is recognized for its work with exoskeleton buildings, including the award-winning residential building on the Upper West Side of Manhattan at 170 Amsterdam Avenue. The 20-story residential high-rise features a concrete exoskeleton with a diagrid design and was developed using newly available modeling technology. The building's exoskeleton moves the structure to the exterior, allowing for flexible floor plans free of columns. A specialized concrete mix was used for the exterior structure which was made to look like limestone. Fiberglass was also used also used on the exterior. DeSimone was nominated and received a Diamond Award for Structural Systems from the American Council of Engineering Companies in 2016 for their work on 170 Amsterdam.

DeSimone is also the structural engineering firm for One Thousand Museum in Miami, Florida. Designed by Zaha Hadid, the building is the first skyscraper by the Pritzker-winning architect in the United States. DeSimone developed a curved "root" exoskeleton structure to support the building. The record setting auger cast pile deep foundation system was installed by HJ Foundation, part of the keller Group. Like with The Grove at Grand Bay project, placing the buildings support systems on the exterior allows for increased space inside and reduces the amount of materials used. The exoskeleton structure was originally purely cosmetic, but DeSimone was able to integrate the design into the structural engineering, creating the exterior support structure out of hollow, precast, concrete panels.

Twisting buildings

DeSimone engineered the first truly twisting towers in the US with The Grove at Grand Bay towers in Miami, Florida designed by the Danish starchitect Bjarke Ingels. Grove at Grand Bay features two 20-story buildings with 98 apartments that feature 12-foot high ceilings and 14-foot deep balconies. The twisting element of the buildings has a total rotation of 38 degrees, and provides panoramic views of the Biscayne Bay and the Miami skyline.

Like One Thousand Museum, the auger cast pile deep foundation system for this building was by HJ Foundation, part of the Keller Group.  The twisting nature of the columns posed a number of structural challenges. The main challenge was to resist torsion generated in the tower core due to the sloping column geometry. The horizontal component of the gravity load in the columns is resolved in the slabs by transferring it to the interior core shear walls, which are the only consistently vertical structural elements in the building. DeSimone was nominated and received a Platinum Award for Structural Systems from the American Council of Engineering Companies in 2016 for their work on The Grove at Grand Bay

Skyscrapers and supertalls

DeSimone has served as structural engineer for many skyscrapers and is currently working on a supertall building, 125 Greenwich Street designed by Rafael Viñoly which tops out at over 1,000 feet. DeSimone is also the engineering firm behind 99 Hudson Street, an 889-foot residential tower under construction in Jersey City, New Jersey. Upon completion, it will be the tallest building in the state of New Jersey and the 4th tallest residential tower in the United States.

Work with "Starchitects"

DeSimone has worked on projects with many of the world's most renowned architects and architectural firms including Zaha Hadid, Bjarke Ingels, Richard Meier, Robert A.M. Stern, Foster and Partners, Rafael Viñoly, Rem Koolhas, Office for Metropolitan Architecture (OMA), Skidmore, Owings & Merrill (SOM), Kohn Pedersen Fox (KPF), Arquitectonica, and SLCE.

Sustainability

DeSimone is a U.S. Green Building Council (USGBC) National Member organization. DeSimone's work on P.S. 62, The Kathleen Grimm School for Leadership and Sustainability, New York City's first net zero energy school, has received numerous awards including the 2016 AIANY COTE Award, Best Green Project by the Staten Island Chamber of Commerce, Architizer A+ Awards – Primary and High Schools 2016, and Engineering News Record (New York Region) – Best Green Project 2016.

Notable projects
 99 Hudson Street - Jersey City, New Jersey
 100 11th Avenue - New York, New York
 100 East 53rd Street - New York, New York
 1450 Brickell -  Miami, Florida
 17 State Street - New York, New York
 220 Central Park South - New York, New York
 360 State Street - New Haven, Connecticut
 45 East 22nd Street - New York, New York
 90 West Street - New York, New York
 900 Biscayne - Miami, Florida
 Akron Art Museum - Akron, Ohio
 Art Gallery of Alberta - Edmonton, Alberta
 Avalon Willoughby Square - Brooklyn, New York
 Casa 74 - New York, New York
 Erie Art Museum Expansion - Erie, Pennsylvania
 Four Seasons Hotel & Tower - Miami Miami, Florida
 IAC Headquarters New York, New York
 Jacksonville Public Library - Jacksonville, Florida
 Las Vegas City Hall - Las Vegas, Nevada
 Marbella South -  Jersey City, New Jersey
 Marquis - Miami, Florida
 Millennium Tower - San Francisco, California
 O'Reilly Theater - Pittsburgh, Pennsylvania
 One Thousand Museum Tower - Miami, Florida
 Panorama Tower - Miami, Florida
 Paramount Miami World Center - Miami, Florida
 Santander Bank Building - Miami, Florida
 Sofitel New York - New York, New York
 Taubman Museum of Art - Roanoke, Virginia
 The Cosmopolitan of Las Vegas - Las Vegas, Nevada
 The Modern - Fort Lee, New Jersey
 The Ritz-Carlton Washington D.C. - Washington, DC
 The Standard High Line - New York, New York
 Tower 28 - Queens, New York
 Trump SoHo - New York, New York

References

External links
 

1969 establishments in New York City
American companies established in 1969
Construction and civil engineering companies established in 1969
Consulting firms established in 1969
Design companies established in 1969
Construction and civil engineering companies of the United States
Companies based in New York City